Miguel Ángel Toma (born September 18, 1949) is an Argentine Justicialist Party politician.

Biography

Toma earned degrees in philosophy and theology at the San Miguel campus of the Jesuit Universidad del Salvador. He was an early supporter of Antonio Cafiero's Peronist Renewal faction within the Justicialist Party, and was elected to the Argentine Chamber of Deputies for the City of Buenos Aires in 1985. He served in the defense and security committees. His party list lost the 1997 congressional primaries to Daniel Scioli's, however, who enjoyed the support of President Carlos Menem, and Toma consequently left Congress. Supported by close Menem adviser José Luis Manzano, Toma was appointed Secretary of Security by Menem in 1998.

Amid political crisis of December 2001, Toma was appointed Minister of Justice, Interior, Defense and Human Rights, holding all roles concurrently for just 48 hours. He was subsequently named president of the Buenos Aires Province chapter of the Justicialist Party.

Toma was the Secretary of Intelligence of Argentina from July 2002 to 2003. He was appointed by then President Eduardo Duhalde to replace the previous Secretary, Carlos Soria, following the assassination of two left-wing agitators in Avellaneda. During his tenure, the final report on the AMIA bombing was published to the judicial branch and foreign intelligence services, but would remain classified to the general public.

Toma was brought on as a campaign adviser to Buenos Aires Mayor Mauricio Macri in the latter's putative 2011 campaign for the presidency.

See also
List of Argentine Secretaries of Intelligence

References

1949 births
Living people
People from Buenos Aires Province
Universidad del Salvador alumni
Members of the Argentine Chamber of Deputies elected in Buenos Aires
Justicialist Party politicians
Argentine Secretaries of Intelligence
Ministers of Internal Affairs of Argentina